A novena is a nine-day devotional worship in Christianity.

Novena may also refer to:

Novena, Singapore, a planning area
Novena MRT station
Novena University, in Ogume, Delta State, Nigeria
Novena (computing platform), an open-source computing hardware project
Novena (album), by Slapshock, 2004
The Novena, a 2005 Canadian film